Dasyatis hastata is a species of stingray in the family Dasyatidae. Some authors regard this species as a synonym of the roughtail stingray (D. centroura).

References

Dasyatis
Taxa named by James Ellsworth De Kay
Fish described in 1842